John Eyre (died 22 September 1581) was an English politician.

He was the eldest son of John Eyre of Wedhampton and Chirton, Wiltshire, who he succeeded in 1554.

He was a Justice of the Peace for Wiltshire by 1559 and was appointed High Sheriff of Wiltshire for 1565–66. He was a Member (MP) of the Parliament of England for Wiltshire in 1563 and Salisbury in 1571.

He married twice: firstly Anne, the daughter of Thomas Tropenell of Great Chalfield, and coheiress of her brother Giles, with whom he had a son and six daughters; and secondly Elizabeth, the daughter of Richard Dauntsey of Potterne. He acquired Great Chalfield manor via his first wife. He was succeeded by his son Sir William, later an MP for Wiltshire.

References

 

Year of birth missing
1581 deaths
High Sheriffs of Wiltshire
English MPs 1563–1567
English MPs 1571